Sir James Stratford Tynte, 1st Baronet (August 1760 – 10 November 1785) was an Anglo-Irish baronet.

Tynte was the son of Robert Tynte and Lady Elizabeth Stratford, daughter of John Stratford, 1st Earl of Aldborough. He was a General in the Irish Volunteers. In 1778 he was created a baronet, of Dunlaven in the Baronetage of Ireland. Tynte served as High Sheriff of Wicklow in 1785. Upon his death his title became extinct.

References

1760 births
1785 deaths
18th-century Anglo-Irish people
Baronets in the Baronetage of Ireland
High Sheriffs of Wicklow
Irish officers in the British Army